Babelomurex armatus is a species of sea snail, a marine gastropod mollusc in the family Muricidae, the murex snails or rock snails.

Distribution
This species occurs in Japan and Philippines.

References

External links
http://www.gastropods.com/5/Shell_3065.shtml

armatus
Gastropods described in 1912